Mix It Up is a 2004 album by Jump5, or the title song.

Mix It Up may also refer to:
Mix It Up, a reality television lifestyle show by Coquette Productions
Mix It Up, a 2015 album by Minoti Vaishnav

Songs
"Mix It Up", a 1965 single by Allison Durbin
"Mix It Up", a 1968 single by The Kingstonians
"Mix It Up", a 1991 single by Dan Reed Network
"Mix It Up", a song by 311 from Uplifter
"Mix It Up", a song by The Marvelettes from Playboy
"Mix It Up", a song by Big Hawk Lil' Keke Wreckin' 2004
"Mix It Up", a song by Bob Schneider from The Californian

See also
 Mixin' It Up, a 1980 album by The Trammps
 Mix Up (disambiguation)